Granbury Independent School District is a public school district based in Granbury, Texas (USA).

In addition to Granbury, the district  serves the eastern Hood County cities of DeCordova and Stockton Bend (formerly Brazos Bend), and the majority of Cresson. The district boundary also includes the unincorporated communities of Canyon Creek, Oak Trail Shores, and Pecan Plantation. Small portions of Parker, Johnson, and Somervell counties also lie within the district.

In 2009, the school district was rated "recognized" by the Texas Education Agency.

In 2022, the district was involved in controversy around the actions of superintendent Jeremy Glenn, who specifically ordered district librarians to remove books with LGBTQ themes and characters. Legal experts said that these actions raised constitutional concerns of illegal discrimination.

Schools

High schools
Grades 9-12 
Granbury High School
Alternative Academic High School
STARS Accelerated High School

Middle schools

Grades 6-8
Granbury Middle School
Acton Middle School

Intermediate schools
Grades 3-5
Brawner Intermediate School

Elementary schools
Grades PK-5
Acton Elementary School
Mambrino School
Nettie Baccus Elementary School
Oak Woods School
Grades PK-2
Emma Roberson Elementary School

Behavior school
All Grades
Behavior Transition Center

Students

Academics

Students in Granbury typically perform close to local region and statewide averages on standardized tests.  In 2015-2016 State of Texas Assessments of Academic Readiness (STAAR) results, 76% of students in Granbury ISD met Level II Satisfactory standards, compared with 77% in Region 11 and 75% in the state of Texas. The average SAT score of the class of 2015 was 1461, and the average ACT score was 21.9.

Demographics
In the 2015–2016 school year, the school district had a total of 6,971 students, ranging from early childhood and pre-kindergarten through grade 12. The class of 2015 included 444 graduates; the annual drop-out rate across grades 9-12 was 1.0%.

As of the 2015–2016 school year, the ethnic distribution of the school district was 72.3% White, 23.7% Hispanic, 0.7% Asian, 0.7% American Indian, 0.6% African American, 0.2% Pacific Islander, and 1.8% from two or more races. Economically disadvantaged students made up 49.7% of the student body.

Book banning and discrimination 
In 2015, district librarians received 50 complaints to remove two books from their shelves, both of which center LGBTQ content: Gayle E. Pitman's This Day in June and Cheryl Kilodavis's My Princess Boy. The library board refused to remove the books, stating that the books do not promote homosexuality and that parental approval is already required to check out the books; however, they moved This Day in June to the adult section. Challengers turned to the Hood County Commissioners Court, which ruled that banning the books could be unconstitutional.

Between 2015 and 2022, challengers protested the decision and politically mobilized to gain access to the school board and commissioners court. In November 2021, those running for historically non-partisan city positions (e.g., school board) included signal phrases such as "conservative" and "Republican" in their campaign materials. Courtney Gore and Melanie Graft, who ran for and won positions on the school board, promised to "comb through educational materials for any signs of  'indoctrination' in the form of books or lesson plans that they charged promote LGBTQ ideology or what they referred to as critical race theory."

In 2022, Superintendent Jeremy Glenn is reported to have met with district librarians behind closed doors to instruct them to remove books featuring LGBTQ characters and storylines, even if those books did not describe sex or violence, saying, "It’s the transgender, LGBTQ ... that’s what we’re pulling out." As a result of the meeting, the libraries removed 130 titles for review, nearly 75% of which featured LGBTQ characters or themes. Kate Huddleston, a staff attorney with the American Civil Liberties Union of Texas, commented that this "is very much evidence of anti-LGBTQ and particularly anti-trans discrimination."

References

External links
Granbury ISD 

School districts in Hood County, Texas
School districts in Johnson County, Texas
School districts in Parker County, Texas
School districts in Somervell County, Texas